A Great Deliverance is a book written by Elizabeth George and published by Bantam Books (now owned by Random House) on 1 May 1988 which later went on to win the Anthony Award for Best First Novel in 1989.

References 

Anthony Award-winning works
American mystery novels
1988 American novels
Bantam Books books